Jeremy Craig Kasten (born March 25, 1971) is an American film director, screenwriter, producer and editor. Kasten is best known for his arthouse horror pieces, which range from psychological horror films such as The Attic Expeditions (2001) and The Dead Ones (2010) to Grand Guignol, such as his re-imagining of Herschell Gordon Lewis’s classic splatter film The Wizard of Gore (2007) and his contribution to the horror anthology film The Theatre Bizarre (2011). Other work includes the zombie film All Soul’s Day: Dia de los Muertos (2005) and the drug-fueled vampire film The Thirst (2006).

Early life

Kasten was born in Baltimore, Maryland and grew up performing in local television and theater with his family. He attended the Baltimore School for the Arts where he was in an acting ensemble with Tupac Shakur and Jada Pinkett. In his junior year, Kasten and his friends (street artist Maya Hayuk and producer Daniel Griffiths) appeared in John Waters’s film Hairspray.

Kasten attended Emerson College in Boston, Massachusetts where he completed work on his first Indie film Off the Road during his sophomore year. The film was shot on VHS on the weekends and featured a crew of local talent and Emerson students. The film screened at the First Church of Boston. In 1992, Kasten moved to Los Angeles on an Emerson internship program, but soon began to work various roles in film crews while he learned the craft of film editing.

Career

Film

Before starting work on his own feature films, Kasten worked odd jobs in the film industry, including as William Friedkin’s personal assistant during production of Jailbreakers and as video editor for Playboy TV.  Soon, Kasten became known for his editing skills and became a go-to editor for straight-to-video distributors and cut over a dozen feature films before the age of 25. He was the last editor on the infamous film Skinner starring Traci Lords and Ricki Lake and directed by convict and ex-boyfriend of Heidi Fleiss, Ivan Nagy. In this period Kasten edited Phat Beach, which first-time director and Entourage creator Doug Ellin called “probably the worst movie ever made”.  Kasten first made his mark with Mindfire/CFQ Entertainment as editor of the superhero spoof The Specials directed by screenwriter Craig Mazin and featuring Rob Lowe, Thomas Haden Church, Paget Brewster, Judy Greer, Jamie Kennedy and James Gunn, who also wrote the film.

In 1997, Kasten began work on his own feature, The Attic Expeditions, a low budget experimental horror film starring Seth Green and Jeffrey Combs. Tim Heidecker was the intern on the film and has a cameo appearance. The film featured a noted appearance by Alice Cooper as a mental patient. It premiered at the Seattle International Film Festival, played in Los Angeles and later saw wide release on video by distributor Blockbuster/DEJ Entertainment. The movie received mixed reviews due to its complex plot, with Kevin Thomas from the Los Angeles Times saying, “imaginative and audacious. Willing to challenge as well as entertain. A low-budget gem.”

Kasten’s next film, All Soul’s Day: Dia de los Muertos, was released in 2005 and used the Mexican Day of the Dead as a backdrop for zombie horror. Noted for its three time periods and stars such as Laz Alonso, David Keith, Jeffrey Combs, Laura Harring and Danny Trejo, the film premiered to sold out audiences at the 2005 Slamdance Film Festival and plays cable television every November 1. In The Zombie Movie Encyclopedia Peter Dendle described it “like something Barbara Steele should have been in and Mario Bava should have made in black and white.” 

The Thirst (2006), Kasten’s third film and second for Starz! Media, is a vampire horror film starring Clare Kramer, Neil Jackson, Jeremy Sisto, Adam Baldwin and Otep. The film, which went through over 200 gallons of custom-mixed prop blood, premiered at the Sitges Fantasy and Horror Festival to a standing ovation. The New York Times called it “Out and out pretension… A vampire movie that tries to say something smart about connections between vampirism, sexuality and drug addiction… Just disgusting.” 

In 2008 Kasten released his vision of the Herschel Gordon Lewis classic The Wizard of Gore starring Kip Pardue, Crispin Glover, Bijou Phillips, Jeffrey Combs, Brad Dourif and The Suicide Girls. Kasten’s version is a splatter-noir cover in which Los Angeles becomes, according to André Loiselle and Jeremy Maron in their book 
Stages of Reality: Theatricality in Cinema,  "an arena for repulsive, mesmerizing and sexually charged spectacles.”   The film premiered at the Los Angeles Film Festival and several showings were added due to high demand and sold out seats. Anton Bitel has called the film a “masterclass in the art of the remake.” 

Kasten’s latest film, The Dead Ones, is known for featuring the world’s first pre-release cinemograph artwork.

In 2011 Kasten co-directed the anthology horror film The Theatre Bizarre along with directors Buddy Giovinazzo, Tom Savini and Richard Stanley.  His wrap-around segments star Udo Kier and was filmed in the Million Dollar Theater. The film opened the Fantasia International Film Festival before touring worldwide to audiences fainting and vomiting with general panic in the theaters.

Television

Kasten has produced and edited dozens of behind–the-scenes specials for studio films and created and edited multiple reality shows for television. He has directed recreation shows for networks A&E Biography, Discovery ID and directed all episodes of History Channel’s controversial “The Exorcist Files” which was pulled following pressure from the Vatican.

Theatre

When Erika Larsen, the daughter of the founders of The Magic Castle, created the Brookledge Follies in 2008 and reopened her family’s historic Los Angeles Theater, she chose Kasten as its original director. During his tenure at Brookledge, he collaborated with world-renowned variety performers including Penn Jillette, Michael Carbonaro, Ann Magnuson, Billy the Mime, The Lampshades, Kristian Hoffman, Puddles Pity Party and Neil Hamburger.

The Brookledge Follies is considered among the toughest theater tickets to get in Los Angeles.

Works

Filmography

TV

References

External links
 
Official website

American film editors
Living people
Artists from Baltimore
Emerson College alumni
Film directors from Maryland
1971 births